Salaberry-de-Valleyfield Aerodrome  is located  southwest of Salaberry-de-Valleyfield, Quebec, Canada.

See also
 List of airports in the Montreal area

References

Salaberry-de-Valleyfield
Registered aerodromes in Montérégie